Eastwood Academy is a secondary school in the Eastwood neighborhood of the East End, Houston, Texas, United States. The school is a member of the Houston Independent School District and is a school-of-choice for residents in the city of Houston.

Eastwood Academy has been an "exemplary" high school since 2008, and is rated by the Texas Education Agency and was nominated as a Blue Ribbon School in 2010 and received the award, officially, in 2011.

Eastwood Academy has been ranked number 3 in the Greater Houston area by Children at Risk, number 70 in the nation by The Washington Post, and number 22 in the nation by U.S. News .

History
Eastwood was built in 1954 as a Baptist Church before the Houston Independent School District bought the property and admitted the school as an internal charter in 2001. The  building was renovated and expanded for "re-adaptive" use for 175 students. The renovation included administrative offices, library, cafeteria, classrooms, science laboratories, computer laboratories and a multi-purpose room with a stage. The school was originally supposed to be a 9th grade school and feeder to the nearby Austin High School. After some consideration, the founders decided that the school would serve as a small-school alternative to Austin HS, Milby HS, and Chavez HS.

Since then Eastwood Academy has admitted students from all around the Houston area; the majority enrolled are from nearby schools, some of which include Jackson Middle School, Edison Middle School, and Project Chrysalis Middle School, but others include Rice Middle, Lanier Vanguard, and TH Rogers Middle.  Project Chrysalis Middle School makes up 38% of the class of 2016. Students are required to apply since it is a charter school and are admitted based on their grade point averages, standardized test scores, teacher recommendations, and interviews (which are conducted by the faculty and administration.)

Eastwood Campus Expansion
As a part of the Houston Independent School District's 2007 bond, Eastwood Academy has expanded in the form of a new two-story wing attached to the original building. This new wing included two science classrooms, a lecture hall, and additional classrooms, which include a smart board.

The school has completed its planning and building of the expansion of the  brand-new building as a part of the Houston Independent School District's 2012 bond. The new building completed construction in January 2018.

Student body
In 2006 most of the students were of Mexican and Central American ancestry, of low income backgrounds, and had parents who had immigrated to the United States shortly prior.

Academics
Eastwood Academy offers Advanced Placement courses and Dual-Credit courses (through the Houston Community College system).

Advanced Placement courses include: Statistics, Calculus AB/BC, Biology, Chemistry, Physics 1, Environmental Science, English Language and Composition, English Literature and Composition, Spanish Language and Culture, Spanish Literature and Culture, Human Geography, World History, U.S. History, European History, Art History, Studio Art, Computer Science A, U.S. Government and Politics, and Macroeconomics. Dual Credit courses include: English 1301 and 1302, Psychology 2301, Sociology 2301, Economics 2301, Government 2301, and Speech 1315. Along with these courses, students are encouraged to self-study or seek assistance for AP examinations not available as a class through the school (such as Comparative Government and Politics) or not being taken as a course by the student.

In 2006 Todd Spivak of the Houston Press wrote that it "is a college prep school that's boosting expectations for all Houston inner-city students."

Operations
In 2006 the school sought grants and donations from corporations so it could install new technology because there was reduced governmental funding for high schools with lower student enrollments.

Transportation
In 2006 most students walked or used bicycles since the school did not have school bus services.

Athletics and Clubs 
Eastwood Academy formerly offered volleyball and rugby through local divisions. However, the school continues to have a soccer team that participates in a local division. Due to the small size of the school, Eastwood Academy students that wish to participate in other athletic sports must do so through the school they are zoned to.

Eastwood Academy offers several clubs that students can participate in. These include: the Gay-Straight Alliance (GSA), National Honor Society, Science National Honor Society, National Technical Honor Society, Debate (through the Houston Urban Debate League ), Motion Picture Society (Film Club), Anime Club, Fitness Club, Social Activists Club, CyberPatriot, and SkillsUSA. In addition, students are able to start their own clubs, if approved by the staff, via a form.

Graduation and college acceptance

Eastwood Academy has averaged, over the past seven years, a 99.7% graduation rate. In some cases juniors (11th graders) are able to graduate early because they have completed the required coursework earlier than their peers (3-5% of students each year). 100% of each graduating class has been accepted to college since 2007.

References

External links

 

University-affiliated schools in the United States
Houston Independent School District high schools
Charter high schools in Houston
Educational institutions established in 1999
1999 establishments in Texas
East End, Houston